is a Japanese singer, songwriter, lyricist and voice actress from Shizuoka Prefecture. From 2016 to 2019, she performed under the stage name Minami.

Her involvement in the game and anime Kimi ga Nozomu Eien, where she voiced the role of one of the characters, Haruka Suzumiya and performed and penned the theme songs and other songs relating to the series, has brought her much attention. Her single "Precious Memories", used as the opening theme song for the series' animated version was a success; it had a peak ranking of 17th place on the Oricon charts and charted for 14 weeks. She has since performed songs for other games and anime, including series such as Muv-Luv, Chrono Crusade, My-HiME, My-Otome, Kure-nai, and School Days.

Kuribayashi has performed as part of the group Wild 3nin Musume, whose other present members are Joy Max (a.k.a. Joy Max Maximum) and Kisho Taniyama (a.k.a. Jackie Yang). She also once paired with Chiaki Takahashi to form the group exige, where Takahashi was known as CT. Veronica. Also, she is part of Sound Horizon.

Filmography

TV animation 
 Kimi ga Nozomu Eien (Haruka Suzumiya)
 Mai Otome (Erstin Ho)
 School Days (Minami Obuchi)

OVAs 
 Akane Maniax (Haruka Suzumiya)
 Ayumayu Gekijou (Haruka Suzumiya, Kasumi Yashiro)
 Kimi ga Nozomu Eien ~Next Season~ (Haruka Suzumiya)
 My-Otome Zwei (Ribbon-chan)
 School Days ~Magical Heart Kokoro-chan~ (Minami Obuchi)

Internet animation 
 Ayumayu Gekijou (Haruka Suzumiya, Kasumi Yashiro)

Games 
 Age Maniax (Susie, Fumino)
  (Priere)
 Kimi ga Nozomu Eien (Haruka Suzumiya)
 School Days (Minami Obuchi)
 School Days L x H (Minami Obuchi)
 "Hello, world." (Haruka Tomonaga)
 Muv-Luv (Kasumi Yashiro)
 Muv-Luv Alternative (Kasumi Yashiro, Haruka Suzumiya)
 Muv-Luv Altered Fable (Kasumi Yashiro, Haruka Suzumiya)
 My-Otome: Otome Butoushi!! (Erstin Ho)

Discography

Solo

Singles

Albums

Studio albums

Best albums

DVDs 
 Kuribayashi Minami in BASXI Secret Live "Birthday eve"
 2003-11-27: Kuribayashi Minami Music Clip "Precious Memories"
 2008-02-27: Kuribayashi Minami 1st Live Tour 2007 "Fantastic Arrow"

References

External links

  
 

Living people
Voice actresses from Shizuoka Prefecture
Japanese voice actresses
Japanese women pop singers
Japanese women singer-songwriters
Japanese singer-songwriters
Anime musicians
Avex Group artists
Lantis (company) artists
Musicians from Shizuoka Prefecture
21st-century Japanese actresses
21st-century Japanese singers
21st-century Japanese women singers
1976 births